Zahida is a Pakistani given name for females. Notable people with the name include:

 Zahida Hina, Pakistani writer
 Zahida Hussain (born 1944), Indian actress
 Zahida Manzoor (born 1958), English businesswoman

Pakistani feminine given names